Hurst is an unincorporated community in Lewis County, in the U.S. state of West Virginia.

History
A post office called Hurst was established in 1893, and remained in operation until 1975. The community has the name of a local pioneer named Hurst.

References

Unincorporated communities in Lewis County, West Virginia
Unincorporated communities in West Virginia